John B. Hill (born 8 May 1949) is a former association football player who represented New Zealand at the 1982 FIFA World Cup.

Hill's first professional club was Glentoran in Belfast, Northern Ireland. He moved to New Zealand in 1975, where he played for Gisborne City from 1980 until 1982.

Hill made his full All Whites debut in a 4–0 win over Mexico on 20 August 1980 and ended his international playing career with 17 A-international caps to his credit.

He represented the All Whites at the 1982 FIFA World Cup in Spain in the 2–5 loss to Scotland, bud did not feature in the other two matches against USSR and Brazil. His solitary finals appearance was Hill's last cap for his adopted country.

References

External links

1950 births
Living people
New Zealand association footballers
Glentoran F.C. players
New Zealand international footballers
Gisborne City AFC players
Association football defenders
1980 Oceania Cup players
1982 FIFA World Cup players